Jordan Timothy Jenks (born September 19, 1993), known professionally as Pi'erre Bourne, is an American record producer, audio engineer, beatmaker, and rapper. He is best known for producing the singles "Magnolia" by Playboi Carti and "Gummo" by 6ix9ine, entering the Top 30 of the US Billboard Hot 100. After the release of Playboi Carti's breakout track "Magnolia" from his self-titled debut commercial mixtape Playboi Carti (2017), Bourne's producer tag, "Yo Pierre, you wanna come out here?" (a line sampled from an episode of The Jamie Foxx Show), became an internet meme leading the tag to become widely known and Bourne to break out as a producer. Since 2017, he has worked extensively with artists such as Lil Uzi Vert, Lil Yachty, Young Thug, Juice Wrld, Young Nudy, Trippie Redd, and Kanye West.

Early life 
Jenks was born in Fort Riley, Kansas but grew up in Columbia, South Carolina. Growing up, he would spend his summers with his grandmother in Queens, which led to his interest in East Coast hip hop artists such as Dipset and G-Unit. He is related to Mobile Malachi, a Belizean Kriol Reggae artist and musician. He is also a cousin of Papoose, who is of Liberian descent. Inspired by his uncle Dwight who was a rapper and graphic artist, Jenks first began making beats when he was in elementary school, using FL Studio on his uncle's computer.

Career 
Jenks went to school for graphic design for a year before dropping out. At 18, his uncle encouraged him to pursue his career in music and Jenks moved to Atlanta to study sound engineering at the SAE Institute. While in school, he met and began collaborating with DJ Burn One, who encouraged him to create his own instrumentals and not rely on samples. After graduating from school, the studio where the two worked hired him as a full-time engineer. In 2015, Jenks began working for Epic Records as a sound engineer, leaving a year later to focus on his own career.

Jenks began producing for Young Nudy and Trippie Redd in 2016. He met Playboi Carti in February 2017, collaborating on the track "Woke Up Like This" and produced most tracks on his debut project. Their song "Magnolia" peaked at 29 on the US Billboard Hot 100. This kickstarted Jenks' producing career, producing songs for 21 Savage, Trippie Redd, Rich the Kid, Lil Yachty, Famous Dex, Nav, Young Thug and Lil Uzi Vert. Jenks has also released a series of mixtapes called The Life of Pi'erre and has his own imprint, SossHouse, at Interscope Records.
He produced Travis Scott's single "Watch" which features Kanye West and Lil Uzi Vert. He also produced Playboi Carti's album Die Lit. He also helped produce Kanye West's albums Ye and Jesus Is King.

On May 8, 2019, Pi'erre Bourne and close collaborator Young Nudy released their collaborative mixtape titled Sli'merre. The project, which consists of 12 songs, featured then-rising hip-hop stars DaBaby and Megan Thee Stallion, along with Nudy's cousin and multi-platinum rapper 21 Savage, as well as fellow multi-platinum recording artist Lil Uzi Vert. All songs on the mixtape were produced by Pi'erre, and hit number 1 on Apple Music's US All Genres chart, and debuted at number 167 on the Billboard 200, later peaking at number 63 in the following week. On March 25, 2020, Jenks debuted at No. 1 on Billboards Hot 100 Producers chart, thanks to four production credits on the deluxe edition of Lil Uzi Vert's second album, Eternal Atake.

On June 19, 2020, almost exactly a year after The Life of Pi'erre 4s release, a deluxe edition was released. Jenks also earned himself a placement on Drake's Dark Lane Demo Tapes, producing the song "Pain 1993", featuring Jenks' frequent collaborator Playboi Carti. The song would debut and peak in the top ten (at number 7) on the Hot 100 on May 16, 2020.

In March 2021, Jenks won his first Grammy Award for his production work on Kanye West's album, Jesus is King. On June 11, 2021, Jenks's second studio album, The Life of Pi'erre 5, was released by Interscope via Pi'erre's label imprint, SossHouse. The album is entirely produced by Jenks and includes features from Lil Uzi Vert, Playboi Carti, and Sharc.
 
On January 14, 2022 Lil Wayne would re-release his Sorry 4 the Wait mixtape with four new songs, with the song "Cameras" with Allan Cubes produced by Jenks.

On August 26, 2022, Jenks released a single called "Good Movie", and on September 2, 2022, he released his third studio album titled Good Movie. The album was released by Interscope records and through  SossHouse. The album features Don Toliver and Young Nudy.

On February 24, 2023, Jenks released his highly sought after song, Instagram Hoes, as IG. Fans had heard snippets of this song previously on Jenks’ Instagram livestreams, where he often would tease music he had been working on.

Artistry 
Jenks is influenced by Wiz Khalifa, Young Jeezy, Gucci Mane, J Dilla, Pharrell Williams, Timbaland and Kanye West. Like West, Jenks wants to continue to work as a producer, while pursuing his own rap career. Alphonse Pierre of Pitchfork described Bourne's productions as "beats that pair airy video-game melodies with classic trap drums". His beats typically feature synth pads and flute sounds alternating between 2 or 3 chords.

Discography

Studio albums

Collaboration albums

Extended plays 
 King of the Hill,  October 31, 2014, self-released
 SossGirl,  February 15, 2016, self-released

Mixtapes 
 The Bourne Identity, April 4, 2010, self-released
 The Bourne Ultimatum, June 4, 2010, self-released
 The Bourne Supremacy, August 19, 2010, self-released
 Heir To The Throne (Deluxe), January 27, 2012, self-released
 The Life of Pi'erre, September 19, 2016, self-released
The Life of Pi'erre 2, November 25, 2016, self-released
The Life of Pi'erre 3, December 26, 2016, self-released

Singles

Other charted songs

Production discography

Charted singles

Other charted songs

References 

Living people
1993 births
People from Columbia, South Carolina
African-American male rappers
African-American record producers
American audio engineers
American people of Belizean descent
21st-century African-American people
FL Studio users